Kehly Run (also known as Kahly Run) is a tributary of Shenandoah Creek in Schuylkill County, Pennsylvania, in the United States. The stream is located within the Western Middle Anthracite Field. A number of dams have been constructed across it. The stream is classified as a Coldwater Fishery and has macroinvertebrates, but no fish.

Course
Kehly Run begins in Fetter Pond in West Mahanoy Township. It flows west for several hundred feet, passing through another pond and entering Number Six Reservoir. From the southern end of this reservoir, the stream turns south-southeast for several tenths of a mile, passing near Number Five Reservoir, crossing Pennsylvania Route 924, and entering a valley. In this valley, the creek flows in a generally southerly direction for several tenths of a mile, passing through Kehly Run Reservoir Number Three and Number Two Reservoir. Towards the lower reaches of this valley, in West Mahanoy Township, or possibly at or shortly after its end, in Shenandoah, the stream reaches its confluence with or becomes Shenandoah Creek.

Hydrology
Kehly Run is designated as an impaired waterbody. The stream is impacted by abandoned mine drainage. However, it has been described as having "very good" water quality at site S11, in its upper reaches. In the late 1800s, the stream was described as having once been a stream of "good, soft, pure mountain water".

Geography and geology
The stream is situated entirely within the Western Middle Anthracite Field. There is some abandoned mine land in the vicinity of the stream's upper reaches.

The dried sediment of Kehly Run was light olive brown in the Munsell color system.

In 1980, the dam was judged to be in fair condition. There are three reservoirs further upstream and one pool further downstream.

Watershed
The stream is entirely within the United States Geological Survey quadrangle of Shenandoah.

The watershed of Kehly Run occupies a total of approximately 1 percent of the Mahanoy Creek drainage basin. The watershed is located near the northeastern corner of the Shenandoah Creek watershed and in the upper part of the Mahanoy Creek watershed.

History
Kehly Run was entered into the Geographic Names Information System on August 2, 1979. Its identifier in the Geographic Names Information System is 1178301. The stream is also known as Kahly Run. This variant name appears in a 1975 highway map of Schuylkill County, published by the Pennsylvania Department of Transportation.

In 2007, environmental assessments were proposed or made for the breaching of five dams in the watershed of Kehly Run.

Biology
In 2001, no fish were observed in Kehly Run near Shenandoah, but macroinvertebrates were observed. A total of ten macroinvertebrate taxa were observed. Hydropsychidae was classified as "abundant", with 25 to 100 individuals being observed. Leuctridae and Simuliidae were classified as "common", with 10 to 24 individuals being observed. The taxa Cordulegastridae and Crydalidae were classified as "present", with three to nine individuals being observed. Another several taxaAeshnidae, Calopterygidae, Tipulidae, Cambaridae were "rare", with only one or two individuals of each being observed. A small number of miscellaneous individuals from Diptera were observed.

Second-growth forest occurs in the vicinity of some reaches of Kehly Run. The family-level Hilsenhoff Biotic Index value of the stream was 4.14.

Historically, Kehly Run was used as a trout-fishing stream. The stream is classified as a Coldwater Fishery.

See also
Lost Creek (Shenandoah Creek), next tributary of Shenandoah Creek going downstream
List of rivers of Pennsylvania
List of tributaries of Mahanoy Creek

References

Rivers of Schuylkill County, Pennsylvania
Tributaries of Mahanoy Creek
Rivers of Pennsylvania